The 2000–01 Minnesota Wild season was the team's first season of play in the National Hockey League (NHL). One of the policies that the Wild implemented was never naming a permanent captain. Instead, the team captaincy was rotated on a monthly basis among several of its players each season, with some players serving multiple times.

Off-season

NHL Expansion Draft results

Regular season
The Wild struggled offensively, finishing 30th overall in scoring (168 goals for), power-play goals scored (36) and power-play percentage (9.63%). They were also shut out a league-high 14 times. Combined with the six shut-outs earned in total by goaltenders Manny Fernandez and Jamie McLennan, 20 of the Wild's 82 regular-season games ended in a shutout.

Final standings

Schedule and results

Player statistics

Awards and records
 Most points in a season, defenseman: 30 Filip Kuba, (2000–01)
 Most points in a season, rookie: 36 Marian Gaborik, (2000–01)

Draft picks
Minnesota's draft picks at the 2000 NHL Entry Draft held at the Pengrowth Saddledome in Calgary, Alberta.

References
 Wild on Hockey Database

Minn
Minn
Minnesota Wild seasons